Allotinus maximus is a butterfly in the family Lycaenidae. It was described by Otto Staudinger in 1888. It is found on Sulawesi.

References

Butterflies described in 1888
Allotinus
Butterflies of Indonesia
Taxa named by Otto Staudinger